The 2013 Old Royal Capital Cetinje municipal elections was held in Montenegro on Saturday, November 16, 2013 to elect representatives in the City Parliament of the Old Royal Capital Cetinje. All 33 seats were up for elections. In the previous mandate (2010 - 2013), Cetinje was governed by Democratic Party of Socialists (DPS), with mayor Aleksandar Bogdanović.

There was eight parties which participated in the elections, and DPS won the absolute majority or 19 seats in City Parliament.

Election Law

Under Montenegrin Election Law, lists and parties on the local elections must require support 3% of voters to gain one seat in the City Parliament. On every list, there must be 33 candidates for deputies or less.

Deputies in the City Parliament are voting for new mayor, with minimum support of 51 percent.

Parties and campaign

Before campaign started, eight different parties signed their candidatures for the elections. City Elections' Commission verified all the lists.

Participants

Officially, participants of the Cetinje municipal elections 2013 were sorted by order and names from the next list:

Campaign

Campaign for the local elections started during the first half of October 2013. During that period, the governing DPS with the slogan "Simply Better!" highlighted the results of local government's work during the previous mandate as the guarantee of good work in the future. Leader of DPS list was Mayor of the Old Royal Capital Cetinje Aleksandar Bogdanović.

Opposition parties criticized projects and priorities of the local government from the past period. During the finish of campaign, opposition parties announced their past-elections coalition if they gain majority of votes.

Opinion polls

One week before elections, few medias reported about public opinion poll (http://www.pobjeda.me/2013/11/06/istrazivanje-javnog-mnjenja-dps-na-lokalnim-izborima-na-cetinju-osvojice-apsolutnu-vecinu/#.UuO46fs1jGg). The results indicated a big majority for the Democratic Party of Socialists - Da pobijedi Cetinje! - Milo Đukanović(48.5%).

Voters and poll

On the Cetinje municipal elections 2013, voting right had 14,868 citizens from the whole territory of the Old Royal Capital Cetinje.

There was 39 polling stations.

Results

|-style="background:#E9E9E9;"
!Electoral list
!Votes
!%
!Seats
|-
|Democratic Party of Socialists
| 5,165
| 51.07%
| 19
|-
| Social Democratic Party
| 1,532
| 15.15%
| 5
|-
|Positive Montenegro
| 1,518
| 15.08%
| 5
|-
|Civic Front
| 1,071
| 10.59%
| 3
|-
|Socialist People's Party
| 386
| 3.82%
| 1
|-
|Just Montenegro
| 165
| 1.63%
| 0
|-
| Rule of Law Movement
| 141
| 1.39%
| 0
|-
|Liberal Party
| 135
| 1.33%
| 0
|-
|}

On the election day, ruling Democratic Party of Socialists won the absolute majority (51%) of votes and gained 19 of 33 seats in the City Parliament. Four other lists also gained the seats in the City Parliament.

External links 
Cetinje Electoral Commission
Democratic Party of Socialists - Da Pobijedi Cetinje! - Milo Đukanović, campaign page
Civic Front - Građanski front - Miodrag Lekić, campaign page

2013
Cetinje
2013 elections in Europe
2013 in Montenegro
November 2013 events in Europe